Spulerina isonoma is a moth of the family Gracillariidae. It is known from India (Bihar), Malaysia and Thailand.

The larvae feed on Mangifera indica. They probably mine the leaves or stems of their host plant.

References

Spulerina
Moths of Asia
Moths described in 1916